Ángel Matos García is a Puerto Rican politician affiliated with the Popular Democratic Party (PPD). He was elected to the Puerto Rico House of Representatives in 2012 to represent District 40.

He has a Bachelor of Arts of the administration of the Interamerican University of Puerto Rico. He made his practice in advertising at the technological Institute of higher education TEC in Monterrey, Mexico and the Center Euro Latin American youth in Mollina Malaga in Spain.

References

|-

Interamerican University of Puerto Rico alumni
Living people
People from San Juan, Puerto Rico
Popular Democratic Party members of the House of Representatives of Puerto Rico
Year of birth missing (living people)